The 1896 United States presidential election in Wisconsin was held on November 3, 1896 as part of the 1896 United States presidential election. State voters chose 12 electors to the Electoral College, who voted for president and vice president.

Background
Wisconsin during the Third Party System was a Republican-leaning but competitive state whereby historically anti-Civil War German Catholic counties stood opposed to highly pro-war and firmly Republican Yankee areas. The German Catholics’ Democratic loyalties were related to their opposition to Republican pietism and to the fact that during the Civil War they had been extremely hostile to Abraham Lincoln’s wartime draft policies which often singled them out.

Four year prior had seen, aided by favorable demographic shifts, opposition to the notorious “Bennett Law” requiring attendance at public schools, and a shift of some GOP voters to Prohibition Party nominee John Bidwell, Democratic nominee Grover Cleveland carry the state for the first time since before the Republican Party was formed. However, expectations that demographic shifts would favour the Democrats were rudely crushed in 1894, when the Republicans took every Congressional seat in the state. President Cleveland became extremely unpopular and the Democratic Party turned towards the Populist movement active in the West in order to revive its fortunes.

Whilst the Populist movement would gain almost universal acceptance in the silver mining West, its inflationary monetary policies were opposed by almost all urban classes and viewed as dangerously radical by rural German Catholics, with free silver being condemned by the Church hierarchy.

Vote
Early polls always had Wisconsin strong for Republican nominee William McKinley, with his supporters saying it would be one of the most Republican states despite voting Democratic in 1892. During his fall tour of the Midwest, Democratic nominee William Jennings Bryan made fifteen speeches, but was disturbed by a member of McKinley’s club, who attempted to mob Bryan in Janesville.

As it turned out, McKinley would carry Wisconsin handsomely by over one hundred thousand votes and almost twenty-three percentage points. Wisconsin would be McKinley’s strongest state outside the Northeast.

Results

Results by county

See also
 United States presidential elections in Wisconsin

References

Wisconsin
1896 Wisconsin elections
1896